The men's 200 metre freestyle event at the 1992 Summer Olympics took place on 26 July at the Piscines Bernat Picornell in Barcelona, Spain. There were 55 competitors from 39 nations, with each nation having up to two swimmers (a limit in place since 1984). The event was won by Yevgeny Sadovyi of the Unified Team; it was the first victory in the men's 200 metre freestyle by an athlete from the former Soviet Union since Moscow 1980. Anders Holmertz of Sweden repeated as the silver medalist, becoming the first man to win multiple medals in the event. Antti Kasvio earned a bronze medal in Finland's debut in the event.

Background

This was the ninth appearance of the 200 metre freestyle event. It was first contested in 1900. It would be contested a second time, though at 220 yards, in 1904. After that, the event did not return until 1968; since then, it has been on the programme at every Summer Games.

Three of the 8 finalists from the 1988 Games returned: silver medalist Anders Holmertz of Sweden, fourth-place finisher Artur Wojdat of Poland, and sixth-place finisher Steffen Zesner of East Germany (now competing for unified Germany). Reigning World Champion and world record holder Giorgio Lamberti of Italy competed in the 4 × 200 metre freestyle relay but not this event after a bout of flu at the Italian trials kept him from qualifying. Reigning Olympic champion and Olympic record holder Duncan Armstrong of Australia also competed only in the relay. The other two medalists from the 1991 World Aquatics Championships were Zesner (silver) and Wojdat (bronze).

Bolivia, Finland, Mauritius, Saudi Arabia, Seychelles, Slovenia, and Sri Lanka each made their debut in the event; some former Soviet republics competed as the Unified Team. Australia made its ninth appearance, the only nation to have competed in all prior editions of the event.

Competition format

The competition used a two-round (heats, final) format. The advancement rule followed the format introduced in 1952. A swimmer's place in the heat was not used to determine advancement; instead, the fastest times from across all heats in a round were used. There were 8 heats of up to 8 swimmers each. The top 8 swimmers advanced to the final. The 1984 event had also introduced a consolation or "B" final; the swimmers placing 9th through 16th in the heats competed in this "B" final for placing. Swim-offs were used as necessary to break ties.

This swimming event used freestyle swimming, which means that the method of the stroke is not regulated (unlike backstroke, breaststroke, and butterfly events). Nearly all swimmers use the front crawl or a variant of that stroke. Because an Olympic-size swimming pool is 50 metres long, this race consisted of four lengths of the pool.

Records

Prior to this competition, the existing world and Olympic records were as follows.

The following records were established during the competition:

Schedule

All times are Central European Summer Time (UTC+2)

Results

Heats
Rule: The eight fastest swimmers advance to final A (Q), while the next eight to final B (q).

Finals

There were two finals, one for the top 8 swimmers and one for the next 8 (9th through 16th).

Final B

Final A

References

External links
 Official Report

Swimming at the 1992 Summer Olympics
200 metre freestyle at the Olympics
Men's events at the 1992 Summer Olympics